Jamia Islamia Ishaatul Uloom is a Deobandi Islamic school based in Akkalkuwa in the Nandurbar district of Maharashtra, India. It was founded in 1979 by Ghulam Mohammad Vastanvi, originally in a single hut with only six students, and by 2014 grew to two lakh students across India.

Medical College & Noor Hospital received permission from the state government and the final permission from Medical Council of India, New Delhi to start an M.B.B.S. course in the year 2013 and 100 students have been enrolled into the course. Besides the MBBS College, Jamia has a 300-bed hospital where various surgical operations are carried out along with checkups, treatments, medicines, various pathology, biochemistry, microbiology investigation, X-Ray, sonography free-of-cost. There are around 600 OPD and 230 IPD patients who receive treatment each day. Doctors perform around 30 operations daily in all departments combined.

References

Further reading
Darul Uloom Deoband, Vastanvi and Modi Remarks. India Today.
Vastanvi to focus on Rs. 100 cr college. Times of India.
Cleric. 2011/03/21. NY Times.
For Modi Dilli door hai: Maulana Ghulam Mohammad Vastanvi says. 2013/10/11. wn.com.
Why Akkalkuwa, its students are rooting for Bade Hazrat. Financial Express.
News. 2011/01/31. Tribune India.
Vastanvi never praised Modi, he had to go as he was not from that region. Indian Express''.

Islamic schools in India
Schools in Maharashtra
Nandurbar district
Educational institutions established in 1979
1979 establishments in Maharashtra
Deobandi Islamic universities and colleges